The fastest times in the swimming events at the Islamic Solidarity Games are designated as the Islamic Solidarity Games records in swimming. The events are held in a long course (50 m) pool. The last Games were held in Konya, Turkey in 2022.

All records were set in finals unless noted otherwise.

Men

Women

References

Islamic Solidarity Games
Records